Second Chance, commonly known as 'NTV Second Chance' or 'Second Chance Uganda' is a Ugandan  telenovela produced by NTV Uganda. The story is a remake of a Spanish-language telenovela El Cuerpo del Deseo produced by Telemundo which had aired on NTV Uganda in 2009 winning NTV a big audience in Uganda.

NTV Uganda acquired rights to produce a Ugandan version which features big names like former UNEB Chairman Fagil Mandy as Peter Byekwaso, former Miss Uganda Stellah Nantumbwe as Isabel Byekwaso, sexy media personality Laura Kahunde acting as Angela, Roger Mugisha acting Saava Ssebina, Housen Mushema as Andrew Masa.

This limited-run series is about a man who comes back from the dead and discovers dark secrets about his beautiful widow. It premiered on 31 October 2016 on NTV Uganda and a premiere event at Serena Hotel, Kampala.

Plot
The story features Peter Byekwaso (Fagil Mandy), a wealthy old man who lives in a big mansion with his daughter Angela and his servants. He falls in love with and marries a gorgeous younger woman, Isabel (Stellah Nantumbwe). He dies suddenly, and Isabel marries employee Andrew. But Peter returns to Earth through transmigration: (the passing of a soul into another body after death), in the body of Saava (Roger Mugisha), a handsome, yet poor family man.

Cast
Casting for the Second Chance started early 2015 and Fagil Mandy and Stellah Nantumbwe were the first to be cast in the lead roles as Peter Byekwatso and Isabela Arroyo respectively. The role of Angela, which Anita Fabiola played in the first half of the show was given to Laura Kahunde.  NTV advertised for casting calls and more than three thousand Ugandan actors applied for different roles.  Most roles were however given to well known actors for easy promotion of the show.

Stellah Nantumbwe as Isabel, the notorious but sexy young wife to Peter. In the original opera, Isabela is played by Mexican telenovela actress Lorena Rojas
Roger Mugisha as Saava an equivalent of Salvador played by Mario Cimarro
Fagil Mandy as Peter Byekwaso
Anita Fabiola as Angela
Housen Mushema as Andrew
Laura Kahunde as Angela (Replacing Anita Fabiola)

Awards and nominations

References

External links
 

Telemundo telenovelas
Television series by Universal Television
Ugandan drama television series
2010s Ugandan television series
2016 Ugandan television series debuts
2018 Ugandan television series endings
NTV Uganda original programming